Pajusti is a small borough in Lääne-Viru County in northern Estonia. It is the administrative centre of Vinni Parish.

References

External links 
Satellite map at Maplandia.com

Boroughs and small boroughs in Estonia